The European Union itself does not issue ordinary passports, but ordinary passport booklets issued by its 27 member states share a common format.
This common format features a coloured cover (for which burgundy is recommended : all countries except Croatia follow this recommendation) emblazoned—in the official language(s) of the issuing country (and sometimes its translation into English and French)—with the title "European Union", followed by the name(s) of the member state, the heraldic "Arms" of the State concerned, the word "PASSPORT", together with the biometric passport symbol at the bottom centre of the front cover.

Some EU member states also issue non-EU passports to certain people who have a nationality which does not render them citizens of the European Union (e.g., Danish nationals residing in the Faroe Islands).

In addition, the European Commission issues European Union Laissez-Passers to the members and certain civil servants of its institutions.

Use
With a valid passport, EU citizens are entitled to exercise the right of free movement (meaning they do not need a visa, a certain amount of money or a certain reason to travel freely and no residence permit for settling) in the European Economic Area (European Union, Iceland, Liechtenstein, and Norway), Switzerland and, before 31 December 2020 in the United Kingdom.

The passports of EU citizens are not stamped when entering and leaving the Schengen Area.

When going through border controls to enter an aforementioned country, citizens possessing valid biometric passports are sometimes able to use automated gates instead of immigration counters. For example, when entering the United Kingdom, at major airports, holders of EU biometric passports who are twelve years of age or older can use ePassport gates, whilst all other EU citizens (such as those using a national identity card or a non-biometric passport) and some non-EEA citizens must use an immigration counter. Anyone travelling with children under the age of 12 must also use an immigration counter.

As an alternative to holding a passport, EU citizens can also use a valid national identity card to exercise their right of free movement within the EEA, Switzerland and the United Kingdom (until 1st October 2021 for visitors from the EU). Strictly speaking, it is not necessary for an EU citizen to possess a valid passport or national identity card to enter the EEA or Switzerland. In theory, if an EU citizen outside of both the EEA and Switzerland can prove their nationality by any other means (e.g. by presenting an expired passport or national identity card, or a citizenship certificate), they must be permitted to enter the EEA or Switzerland. An EU citizen who is unable to demonstrate their nationality satisfactorily must nonetheless be given 'every reasonable opportunity' to obtain the necessary documents or to have them delivered within a reasonable period of time.

Common design features 
While considerable progress has been made in harmonising some features, the data page can be found at the front or at the back of an EU passport booklet and there are significant design differences throughout to indicate which member state is the issuer.

Since the 1980s, European Union member states have started to harmonise aspects of the designs of their ordinary passport booklets. Most passports issued by EU member states have the common recommended layout: burgundy in colour with the words "European Union" accompanied by the name of the issuing member state printed on the cover. Non-standard types of passports, such as passport cards (Ireland is still the only EU country to issue a passport in card format), diplomatic, service, and emergency passports have not yet been harmonised.

The newest EU member state Croatia refused to fully comply with the EU common recommended layout even though the Croatian passport has been changed in design due to the recent accession into the EU. From 3 August 2015, the new Croatian passport retained its dark blue passport cover and is the odd one out among the 27 European Union member states' passports.

The common design features are a result of several non-binding resolutions:
 Resolution of the Representatives of the Governments of the Member States of the European Communities, meeting within the Council of 23 June 1981
 Supplementary Resolution to the Resolution adopted on 23 June 1981 concerning the adoption of a passport of uniform pattern, of the Representatives of the Governments of the Member States of the European Communities, meeting within the council on 30 June 1982
 Resolution of the Representatives of the Governments of the Member States, meeting within the council, of 14 July 1986 supplementary to the resolutions of 23 June 1981 and 30 June 1982 concerning the introduction of a passport of uniform pattern
 Resolution of the representatives of the Governments of the Member States, meeting within the Council of 10 July 1995 supplementary to the resolutions of 23 June 1981, 30 June 1982 and 14 July 1986 concerning the introduction of a passport of uniform pattern  
 Resolution of the representatives of the Governments of the Member States, meeting within the Council of 8 June 2004 supplementary to the resolutions of 23 June 1981, 30 June 1982, 14 July 1986 and 10 July 1995 concerning the introduction of a passport of uniform pattern

The security characteristics in EU passports are regulated through both non-binding resolutions and binding regulations:

 Resolution of the representatives of the governments of the Member States, meeting within the Council of 17 October 2000 supplementing the resolutions of 23 June 1981, 30 June 1982, 14 July 1986 and 10 July 1995 as regards the security characteristics of passports and other travel documents
 Council Regulation (EC) No 2252/2004 of 13 December 2004 on standards for security features and biometrics in passports and travel documents issued by Member States
 Regulation (EC) No 444/2009 of the European Parliament and of the Council of 28 May 2009 amending Council Regulation (EC) No 2252/2004 on standards for security features and biometrics in passports and travel documents issued by Member States

Only Irish passports are not obliged by EU law to contain fingerprint information in their chip. With the exception of passports issued by Denmark and Ireland, all EU citizens applying for a new ordinary passport or passport renewal by 28 August 2006 (for facial images) and 28 June 2009 (for fingerprints) should have been biometrically enrolled. This is a consequence of Regulation (EC) 2252/2004 in combination with two follow-up decisions by the European Commission.

Overall format
 Paper size B7 (ISO/IEC 7810 ID-3, 88 mm × 125 mm)
 32 pages, except Finland with 42 pages and Italy with 48 pages (passports with more pages can be issued to frequent travellers)
 Colour of cover: burgundy red (with the exception of Croatia)

Cover
Information on the cover, in this order, in the language(s) of the issuing state:
 The words "EUROPEAN UNION" (before 1997: "EUROPEAN COMMUNITY")
 Name of the issuing state (similar typeface as "EUROPEAN UNION")
 Emblem of the state
 The word "PASSPORT"
 The Biometric Passport symbol

First page
Information on the first page, in one or more of the languages of the European Union:
 The words "EUROPEAN UNION"
 Name of the issuing state (similar typeface to that of "European Union")
 The word "PASSPORT"
 Serial number (may also be repeated on the other pages)

Identification page
Information on the (possibly laminated) identification page, in the languages of the issuing state plus English and French, accompanied by numbers (which vary between member states) that refer to an index that lists the meaning of these fields in all official EU languages:

On the top of the identification page there is the code "P" for passport, the code (ISO 3166-1 alpha-3) for the issuing country, and the passport number. On the left side there is the main photo. On other places there might optionally be the passport holder's height and security features, including a smaller, see-through photo.

For the place of birth in an Irish passport, only the county of birth (not the town/city) is shown for people born on the island of Ireland; for Irish citizens born outside Ireland, only the three-letter international code of the country of birth is provided.

Machine-readable zone

Like all biometric passports, the newer EU passports contain a Machine-readable zone, which contains the name, nationality and most other information from the identification page. It is designed in a way so that computers can fairly easily read the information, although still human readable, since it contains only letters (A–Z), digits and "<" as space character, but no bar code or similar.

Personal name spelling differences
Names containing non-English letters are usually spelled in the correct way in the visual (non-machine-readable) zone of the passport, but are mapped into A-Z according to the standards of the International Civil Aviation Organization (ICAO) in the machine-readable zone.

The following mapping is specified for EU languages: å → AA; ä/æ → AE; ö/ø/œ → OE, ü → UE (German) or UXX (Spanish) and ß → SS.
Letters with accents are otherwise replaced by simple letters (ç → C, ê → E, etc.). For Greek and Bulgarian there are mapping tables based on transliteration into English. They use both their alphabet and the Latin alphabet in the visual zone.

For example, the German names Müller becomes MUELLER, Groß becomes GROSS, and Gößmann becomes GOESSMANN.
The ICAO mapping is mostly used for computer-generated and internationally used documents such as air tickets, but sometimes (like in US visas) also simple letters are used (MULLER, GOSSMANN).

The three possible spelling variants of the same name (e.g. Müller / Mueller / Muller) in different documents sometimes lead to confusion, and the use of two different spellings within the same document (like in the passports of German-speaking countries) may give people who are unfamiliar with the foreign orthography the impression that the document is a forgery. In some countries, the original or alternative spelling of the names may be mentioned on the page facing the identification page or elsewhere in the passport.

It is recommended to use the spelling used in the machine-readable passport zone for visas, airline tickets, etc., and to refer to that zone if being questioned. The same thing applies if the name is too long to fit in the airline's ticket system, otherwise problems can arise. (The machine-readable has room for 39 letters for the name while the visual zone can contain as many as will fit)

Following page
Optional information on the following page:

Remaining pages
 The following page is reserved for:
 Details concerning the spouse of the holder of the passport (where a family passport is issued)
 Details concerning children accompanying the holder (name, first name, date of birth, sex)
 Photographs of the faces of spouse and children
 The following page is reserved for use by the issuing authorities
 The following page carries the index that translates the field numbers into the official languages of the EU
 The remaining pages are reserved for visas and entry and exit stamps
 The inside back cover is reserved for additional information or recommendations by the issuing state in its own official language(s)

EU Member States' Passports

Current Passports of the European Union

Former passports of the European Union 
Following the UK's withdrawal from the European Union in January 2020, the UK and Gibraltar ceased to issue EU passports. British passports have now returned to their previous navy blue design, which first appeared in 1921. Non EU navy blue passports were first issued in March 2020, unlike previous designs the biodata page is now made of polycarbonate.

While in the transition period, UK and Gibraltar passport were considered de facto EU passports, conferring their holders the rights of EU citizens. After the end of the transition period on 1 January 2021, all UK passports now have lost this status.

Prior to the introduction of the UK passport in March 2020, the British passports conformed to the EU standard design. Between March 2019 and March 2020, passports were issued without the 'EUROPEAN UNION' header.

Passports issued in Gibraltar are expected to change to the new UK design in the coming months.

Passport rankings 

, passport rankings (Germany and Spain tied with most in the EU, and Japan in the world with 191 destinations) by the number of countries and territories their holders could visit without a visa or by obtaining visa on arrival in April 2020 were as follows:

For comparison, those for some other countries, including EEA and former EU (UK):

Multiple and simultaneous passports

Same country
Some EU countries, such as Germany, France, Ireland and Malta, allow their citizens to have several passports at once to circumvent certain travel restrictions. This can be useful if wanting to travel while a passport remains at a consulate while a visa application is processed, or wanting to apply for further visas while already in a foreign country. It can also be needed to circumvent the fact that visitors whose passports show evidence of a visit to Israel are not allowed to enter Iran, Iraq, Lebanon, Libya, Saudi Arabia, Sudan, Syria and Yemen (It is, however, possible to get the Israeli entry and exit stamp on a separate piece of paper).

Multiple citizenship

Each EU member state can make its own citizenship laws, so some countries allow dual or multiple citizenship without any restrictions (e.g. France, Ireland, Italy, Sweden, Czech Republic, Denmark), some allow multiple citizenships but ignore existence of other citizenships within their borders (e.g. Poland), some regulate/restrict it (e.g. Austria, Germany, the Netherlands), and others allow it only in exceptional cases (e.g. Lithuania) or only for citizens by descent (e.g. Croatia, Estonia, Slovenia, Spain).

Emergency passports
Decision 96/409/CSFP of the Representatives of the Governments of the Member States meeting within the Council of 25 June 1996 on the establishment of an emergency travel document decided that there would be a standard emergency travel document (ETD).

ETDs are issued to European Union citizens for a single journey back to the EU country of which they are a national, to their country of permanent residence or, in exceptional cases, to another destination (inside or outside the Union). The decision does not apply to expired national passports; it is specifically restricted to cases where valid and unexpired passports have been lost, stolen, destroyed, or are temporarily unavailable (i.e. left somewhere else by accident).

Embassies and consulates of EU countries different to the applicant may issue emergency travel documents if
 the applicant is an EU national whose passport or travel document has been lost, stolen, destroyed, or is temporarily unavailable;
 the applicant is in a country in which the EU country of which s/he is a national has no accessible diplomatic or consular representation able to issue a travel document or in which the EU country in question is not otherwise represented;
 clearance from the authorities of the applicant's country of origin has been obtained.

Right to consular protection in non-EU countries
As a consequence of citizenship of the European Union, when in a non-EU country, EU citizens whose country maintains no diplomatic mission there have the right to consular protection and assistance from a diplomatic mission of any other EU country present in the non-EU country.

Other EEA passports and Swiss passports

Like passports issued by EU member states, passports of other EEA states – Iceland, Liechtenstein, and Norway – as well as of Switzerland, can also be used to exercise the right of free movement within the European Economic Area and Switzerland.

As part of the Schengen agreement, passports and travel documents issued by member states shall comply with minimum security standards, and passports must incorporate a storage medium (a chip) that contains the holder's facial image and fingerprints. This obligation does not apply to identity cards or to temporary passports and travel documents with a validity of one year or less. Iceland, Norway, Switzerland, and Liechtenstein are bound by the rules (whereas Ireland is not), as Regulation (EC) No 2252/2004 constitutes a development of provisions of the Schengen acquis within the meaning of the Agreement concluded by the Council of the European Union and Iceland and Norway, the agreement concluded by the European Union, the European Community and the Swiss Confederation, and the Protocol signed between the European Union, the European Community, the Swiss Confederation and the Principality of Liechtenstein on the accession of the Principality of Liechtenstein to the Agreement between the European Union, the European Community and the Swiss Confederation, concerning the association of the four States with the implementation, application and development of the Schengen acquis .

See also
 Visa requirements for European Union citizens
 Citizenship of the European Union
 National identity cards in the European Economic Area
Passports in Europe
Passports of the EFTA member states
 Passports of European Union candidate states
Five Nations Passport Group
 Visa policy in the European Union
 Schengen Area
 European Union laissez-passer
 Public Register of Travel and Identity Documents Online
 False and Authentic Documents Online (FADO)
 Estonian alien's passport
 Non-citizens (Latvia)

Notes

References

External links

 European Passports in PRADO (The Council of the European Union Public Register of Authentic Travel and Identity Documents Online)

 The three key ways to acquire a European Union passport

European Union

Foreign relations of the European Union